DPA Microphones (originally Danish Pro Audio) is a Danish manufacturer of condenser microphones and microphone solutions for the professional markets, owned by the Italian pro audio manufacturer RCF Audio. The current CEO is Kalle Hvidt. The company was founded in 1992 by two former employees from Brüel & Kjær - Morten Stove and Ole Brosted Sorensen. Brüel & Kjaer had decided to close their Pro Audio department and Morten and Ole made a contract with B&K to take over sales, service and development. DPA was at that time solely supplying high end studio microphones for recording and broadcast use. In 1995 they teamed up with Dan Ingemann Jensen and Jens Jørn Stokholm from DanaBallerina (later Muphone) and co-developed the later famous DPA 4060 and 4061 miniature condenser microphone, which quickly became the preferred microphone in the theatre world on Broadway in New York and the West End in London. The company received the prestigious King Frederik IX award at a ceremony in Fredensborg Castle.

The company’s headquarters is located in Allerød, Denmark, and the production plant is located in Asnæs, Denmark.

In 2017, DPA made a shift in its product line up. The company introduced a new series of products called CORE by DPA. The idea behind CORE by DPA was to solve the issue lavaliers were having with newer digital wireless transmitters. The first products to launch using the new CORE by DPA microphone design was the 4060 series of lavaliers followed by the 6060 series of lavaliers.

On July 30, 2020, NASA’s Perseverance (rover) took off for a seven-month journey to Mars with a DPA 4006 Omnidirectional condenser microphone, an MMA-A Digital Audio Interface, and an MMP-G Modular Active Cable in tow. It touched down successfully on February 18, 2021. In this hostile environment the DPA equipment has been recording the first ever heard sounds from Mars.

Awards

2022: Magnetic Magazine Best of 2022, Live Performance Mic: DPA 2028

2022: Danish Sound Award, granted by Danish Sound Cluster 

2022: TEC Award Nominee - Microphones, Sound Reinforcement - DPA 4055

2022: Professional Audio (German Magazine 11/22) - Spitzenklasse - DPA 4055.

2021: CAS Award Nominee - Outstanding product production - DPA 4097 CORE Micro Shotgun Mic 

2021: Resolution Award Nominee – 4097 CORE Micro Shotgun

2021: Mix Award - Best in Market '21 - 4488 CORE Directional Microphone 

2021: Technical Achievement Awards - Jens-Jørn Stokholm & Ole Moesmann 

2020: The Readers' Choice Awards - 2028 Vocal Microphone 

2020: TEC Award Nominee - 2028 Vocal Microphone 

2020: TEC Award Nominee - 4097 Shotgun Microphone 

2020: TEC Award Nominee – 6066 Headset Mic 

2020: Resolution Award Nominee - 4560 Binaural Headset 

2019: Live Sound International/Pro Sound Web Readers Choice Award - 4099 CORE 

2019: TEC Award Nominee - d:fine CORE 6066 Subminiature Headset Microphone 

2019: Resolution Award - 6060 CORE 

2019: Red Dot Award - d:fine CORE 6066 Subminiature Headset Microphone 

2019: PROSOUND News Best of Show Award - 2028 Vocal Microphone 

2019: IBC Best of Show Awards 2019 - 2028 Vocal Microphone 

2018: Resolution Award Nominee - d:screet CORE 4061 Omni Mic, Loud SPL 

2018: MusicTech Choice Award - MMA-A Digital Audio Interface 

2018: TEC Award Nominee - CORE by DPA 

2017: The Reader's Choice Awards Winner - d:facto 4018VL Linear Vocal Microphone 

2017: TEC Award Technical Nominee - d:facto 4018VL Linear Vocal Microphone 

2016: Sound on Sound Awards nominee - d:vote 4099 Instrument Microphones

2016: TEC Award Technical Nominee - d:screet SC4098 Podium Microphone 

2016: Resolution Award - d:screet Slim 4060 Miniature Omni Mic 

2015: Resolution Award nominee - d:fine In-Ear Broadcast Headset Microphone

2015: Sound & Video Contractor Innovative Products Awards - d:screet SC4098 Podium Miniature Microphones 

2015: TEC Award - d:screet Necklace Microphone 

2014: Resolution Award nominee -d:facto Vocal Microphone

2014: Pronews Gold Award 2013 - d:dicate 4017C 

2014: The Readers´Choice Awards 2014 - d:facto Vocal Microphone

2014: PIPA Award 2014 - d:facto Vocal Microphone 

2013: Resolution Award nominee - d:fine Headset Microphone 
2013: mipa (Musikmesse International Press Award) - d:facto Vocal Microphone 

2013: ProSoundNetwork Best of Show Award, NAMM - d:facto Vocal Microphone 

2013: AudioMedia “Gear of the Year” award - d:facto Vocal Microphone 

2013: ProSoundNetwork Best of Show Award, InfoComm - Podium Microphones

2012: TEC Award nominee - d:fine Headset Microphone 

2012: PAR Excellence Award nominee - Reference Standard Microphone Series 

2012: PAR Excellence Award nominee - d:facto Vocal Microphone 

2012: IBC Award - Highly Commended Stand Design 

2012: Produção Áudio Awards - d:facto Vocal Microphone 

2012: Live Design Product of the Year Award, d:fine Headset Microphone 

2012: Resolution Award - Reference Standard Microphone Series 

2012: Audio Pro International API Award - Studio After Sales Service

2012: Live Design Product of the Year Award - d:fine Headset Microphone

2012: Resolution Award - Reference Standard Microphone Series

2011: TEC Award nominee - 2011A Cardioid Microphone 

2011: MIX Certified Hit - Reference Standard Microphone Series

2011: Audio Media Gear of the Year - Reference Standard Microphone Series

2010: TEC Award nominee - 5100 Mobile Surround Microphone 

2010: Resolution Award - 5100 Mobile Surround Microphone 

2010: PAR Excellence Award - Reference Standard 

2009: The DPA d:vote 4099 instrument microphones received several awards (Audio Media Gear of the Year, TEC Award) 

2007: DPA Microphones received the prestigious award King Frederik IX award 

2006: WFX Best New Product Award - SMK4061 Stereo Microphone Kit With Miniature Microphones 

2004: TEC Award nominee - 4088 Directional Headset Microphone 

2002: TEC Award nominee: 4066 Omnidirectional Headset Microphone 

1989: TEC Award – B&K 4011 Cardioid Microphone

References

Audio equipment manufacturers of Denmark
Danish companies established in 1992
Microphone manufacturers
Danish brands